Missouri/Sedalia Trust Company, also known as the Koppen Trust Company, is a historic bank building located at Sedalia, Pettis County, Missouri.  It was built in 1887, and is a four-story, rectangular Missouri limestone building with Renaissance Revival and Romanesque Revival style design elements.  It features a multigable and towered roofline and heavily embellished wall surface.

It was listed on the National Register of Historic Places in 1983.  It is located in the Sedalia Commercial Historic District.

References

Individually listed contributing properties to historic districts on the National Register in Missouri
Bank buildings on the National Register of Historic Places in Missouri
Romanesque Revival architecture in Missouri
Renaissance Revival architecture in Missouri
Commercial buildings completed in 1887
Buildings and structures in Pettis County, Missouri
National Register of Historic Places in Pettis County, Missouri